Shihab al-Din may refer to:
Adib Sabir (died 1143), royal poet of Persia
Am'aq (died 1148), Persian poet
Shahab al-Din Abu Hafs Umar Suhrawardi (1144–1234), Persian Sufi
Shahab al-Din Yahya ibn Habash Suhrawardi (1155–1191), Persian philosopher
Muhammad of Ghor (1162–1206), sultan of the Ghorid dynasty, Afghanistan
Abu al-Abbas al-Mursi (1219–1286), Spanish Sufi saint
Shihab al-Din al-Qarafi (1228–1285), Egyptian jurist
Ahmad ibn Naqib al-Misri (1302–1367), Egyptian Sunni Shafi'i scholar and author of Reliance of the Traveller
Ahmed Shihabuddine of the Maldives (died c. 1347), Sultan of Maldives
al-Nagawri (fl. 1390), Persian physician
Shihabuddin Bayazid Shah (fl. 1413), Sultan of Bengal
al-Qalqashandi (c. 1355–1418), Egyptian writer and mathematician
An-Nasir Ahmad, Sultan of Egypt (died 1344), Mamluk Sultan of Egypt
ibn Hajar al-`Asqalani, (1372–1448), Shafi‘i Sunni scholar
Al-Mu'ayyad Shihab al-Din Ahmad (1430–1488), Mamluk sultan of Egypt
Ahmad Zarruq (1442–1493), Shadhili Sufi Sheikh
ibn al-Majdi (d. 1447), Egyptian mathematician and astronomer
Shihab al-Din al-Khafaji (1569–1659), Egyptian Hanafi-Maturidi scholar and poet
Shah Jahan (1592–1666), Mughal emperor
Şihabetdin Märcani (1818–1889), Tatar theologian and historian
Muhammad Shahabuddin (1895–1960), Chief Justice of Pakistan
, Iranian Shia Cleric
Shahab ud-Din Mar'ashi Najafi, Iranian-Iraqi Shia Cleric
Khwaja Shahabuddin (1898–1977), Bengali politician
Shabban Shahab-ud-Din (1909–1983), Indian field hockey player
Syed Ahmad Shahabuddin (1925–2008), Malaysian politician
Shahabuddin Ahmed (1930–2022), president and Chief Justice of Bangladesh
Shihabuddin Nadvi (1931–2002), Indian writer
Syed Shahabuddin (1935-2017), Indian politician and diplomat
Shahabuddin Rathod (born 1937), Gujarati comedian
Adnan Shihab-Eldin (born 1943), Kuwaiti, acting secretary-general of OPEC
Makhdoom Shahabuddin (born 1947), Pakistani politician
Shahabuddin Ahmed (artist) (born 1950), Bangladeshi painter
Shahabedin Sadr (born 1962), Iranian politician
, Former President of Iranian Football Federation
Mohammad Shahabuddin (1967–2021), Indian mobster
Shehab El-Din Ahmed (born 1990), Egyptian footballer
Shihab al-Din, Saladin's nephew who died at the Battle of Hattin near Tiberias.
Shihab ad-Din Toghrul, also known as Atabey Sahabeddin, was the regent of Aleppo from 1216 to 1232.
Shahabuddin Hekmatyar, Afghan detained by Pakistan authorities

See also
Shahabuddin Azad, INDIA
Shahab od Din, Afghanistan, village in Afghanistan
Shahab ol Din (disambiguation), places in Iran

Arabic masculine given names